The Corpse Had a Familiar Face is a 1994 American drama film directed by Joyce Chopra and written by Derek Marlowe and Dennis Turner. The film stars Elizabeth Montgomery, Dennis Farina, Yaphet Kotto, Audra Lindley, Branscombe Richmond, LuAnne Ponce, David Spielberg and Lee Horsley. The film premiered on CBS on March 27, 1994.

Plot

Cast 
Elizabeth Montgomery as Edna Buchanan
Dennis Farina as Detective Harry Lindstrom
Yaphet Kotto as Detective Martin Talbot
Audra Lindley as Monica / Edna's Mother
Branscombe Richmond as Rodriguez
LuAnne Ponce as Jennifer Nicholson
Matthew Posey as Sam
David Spielberg as George
Lee Horsley as Ben Nicholson
Silvana Gallardo as Mrs. Sanchez
Kamar de los Reyes as Puerto Rican
Carey Scott as Billy
Kevin Patrick Walls as Stephen Hollings
Hugh Gillin as Stanley
Michael Ray Miller as Sal
Steven Meek as Tom
Stephen Peace as Rookie 
Rebecca Hahn as Cynthia 
Jessica Cole as Marcia 
Yavone Evans as Paula Nicholson
David J. Partington as Alan

References

External links
 

1994 television films
American drama television films
1994 drama films
1994 films
Films directed by Joyce Chopra
Films scored by Patrick Williams
1990s English-language films
1990s American films